This list of other ornithischian type specimens is a list of fossils serving as the official standard-bearers for inclusion in the species and genera of the dinosaur clade Ornithischia that are not members of the clades Ornithopoda, Marginocephalia, or Thyreophora. These organisms include early ornithischians such as the heterodontosaurids and neornithischians such as thescelosaurids and jeholosaurids, close relatives of the ornithopods and marginocephalians. Type specimens are definitionally members of biological taxa and additional specimens can only be "referred" to these taxa if an expert deems them sufficiently similar to the type.

The list

See also
List of Mesozoic theropod type specimens
List of ornithopod type specimens
List of marginocephalian type specimens
List of thyreophoran type specimens

References

Lists of dinosaur specimens
Mesozoic fossil record